Erëleta Memeti (born 30 June 1999) is a Kosovan footballer who plays as a midfielder for German club 1899 Hoffenheim and has appeared for the Kosovo national team.

Career
Memeti has been capped for the Kosovo national team, appearing for the team during the UEFA Women's Euro 2021 qualifying cycle.

International goals

See also
List of Kosovo women's international footballers

References

External links
 
 
 

1999 births
Living people
Kosovan women's footballers
Kosovo women's international footballers
Women's association football midfielders
Frauen-Bundesliga players
SC Freiburg (women) players
People from Schwäbisch Hall
Sportspeople from Stuttgart (region)